Morgado is a surname. Notable people with this surname include:

 Arnold Morgado – (born 1952), American professional football player
 Andrew Morgado – (born 1980), American actor, voice actor, ADR mixer and sound editor
 Bruno Morgado – (born 1997), Swiss professional footballer
 Cristiano Morgado – (born 1979), South African race car driver
 Diogo Morgado – (born 1981), Portuguese actor
 Camila Morgado – (born 1975), Brazilian actress
 Ernest Morgado – (1917–2002), Portuguese-American businessman
 Ernesto Morgado – Professor at Technical University of Lisbon
 Tiago Morgado – (born 1993), Portuguese professional footballer

Surnames